Pinchot may refer to:

 Amos Pinchot, American lawyer and reformist, brother of Gifford Pinchot
 Bronson Pinchot, American actor
 Elaine Joyce Pinchot, American actress
 Gifford Pinchot, American forester and politician, first Chief of the United States Forest Service, and Governor of Pennsylvania
 Gifford Bryce Pinchot, Gifford's son
 Gifford Pinchot III, American entrepreneur, co-founder of the Bainbridge Graduate Institute, and Gifford's grandson
 James W. Pinchot, Gifford's father
 Mary Pinchot Meyer, American socialite and painter, daughter of Amos Pinchot
 Rosamond Pinchot, American socialite, stage and film actress, daughter of Amos Pinchot

Or to:

 Camp Pinchot Historic District
 Gifford Pinchot House
 Gifford Pinchot National Forest
 Gifford Pinchot State Park
 Lake Pinchot
 Mount Pinchot (disambiguation)
 Pinchot Institute for Conservation
 Pinchot Juniper
 Pinchot Pass, on the John Muir Trail
 Pinchot Sycamore
 Pinchot University
 Pinchot Trail System
 Pinchot–Ballinger controversy
 Pinchote